Andrew or Andy Arthur may refer to:

Andrew Arthur (brigadier); see List of Australian generals and brigadiers 
Andy Arthur (actor), appeared in "Hill Street Station", the first episode of Hill Street Blues

See also